The 2020 Vienna attack was a series of shootings that occurred on 2 November 2020 in Vienna, Austria. A few hours before the city was to enter a lockdown due to the COVID-19 pandemic, a lone gunman started shooting in the busy city centre. Four civilians were killed in the attack and 23 others were injured, seven critically, including a police officer. The attacker was killed by police and was later identified as an ISIL sympathizer. Officials said that the attack was an incident of Islamist terrorism.

Attack
The attack began on 2 November 2020 around 20:00 in Vienna, Austria, when a man started shooting at people in six locations: Seitenstettengasse, Salzgries, and Graben. The attacker was armed with a rifle, a handgun, and a machete and was wearing a fake explosive belt.  The attack ended when the gunman was shot dead by police at 20:09 near St. Rupert's Church.

The shooting took place four hours before the midnight start of a nationwide lockdown as new COVID-19 restrictions were due to come into force in Austria, including a 20:00 to 06:00 curfew. Crowds in bars and restaurants were enjoying a last evening out before the lockdown began.

Casualties 

Four people were killed by the attacker: they were a 39-year-old Austrian man, a 24-year-old German woman, a 44-year-old Austrian woman, and a 21-year-old Austrian Muslim man originally from North Macedonia. The attacker was also shot dead by the police at the scene.

Twenty-three other people were wounded with gunshot and stab wounds; thirteen citizens from Austria, four from Germany, two from Slovakia, and one each from Afghanistan, Bosnia and Herzegovina, China, and Luxembourg. Seven suffered life-threatening injuries. Among the wounded was a 28-year-old police officer who was shot and critically injured while responding to the attack. The wounded officer and an elderly woman were saved by a Palestinian and two Turkish-Austrian men, who carried them away from the attacker to ambulances. After confronting the attacker, one of the Turkish-Austrians was shot and wounded. The three men were praised for their actions.

Investigation 
Videos of the shooting surfaced, including one of the attacker shooting a civilian first with a rifle and then up close with a handgun. The police asked that witnesses not post videos and photographs on social media, but rather submit them to the authorities. As a result, the police received a large number of videos from the public following the attack, and an investigation team examined them for evidence.

On the morning of 3 November, searches of apartments linked with the perpetrator took place, and in his home they found a stockpile of ammunition. Austrian authorities said at 01:00 that at least one gunman remained on the run, but that afternoon Minister of the Interior Karl Nehammer said there was no indication of additional attackers. Officials stated that the attack was an act of Islamic terrorism.

ISIL claimed responsibility for the attack a day later, calling the attacker a "soldier of the caliphate" and posting one of his photos with guns and a knife, and released a video of the attacker pledging allegiance to the leader of ISIL, Abu Ibrahim al-Hashimi al-Qurashi. It was not clear, however, whether ISIL helped plan the attack; the group has a track record of claiming responsibility for lone wolf attacks.

Perpetrator 
The perpetrator was identified as 20-year-old Kujtim Fejzulai. He was a dual citizen of Austria and North Macedonia of Albanian ethnic origin and was known to the Austrian Office for the Protection of the Constitution and Counterterrorism. He had been sentenced to 22 months imprisonment in April 2019, after he tried to cross the Turkish border into Syria to join ISIL; however, he was paroled in December 2019, eight months into the sentence. He was one of around 90 Austrian Islamists who have tried to reach Syria. An Austrian official said that investigators believed that he had worshipped at a mosque that Austrian intelligence services suspected of promulgating extremism. Fejzulai had previously taken part in a deradicalization programme run by the DERAD association.

Die Zeit reported that Fejzulai was known to Slovakian police in Bratislava, who had reportedly hindered his purchase of ammunition and reported this to Austrian authorities. Weapons and ammunition with Slovakian identification numbers have been used in several terrorist attacks in the past.

Hours before the attack, Fejzulai had pledged allegiance to ISIL in Arabic in an Instagram post, using the name Abu Dujana al-Albani. In the post he held an assault rifle, handgun, and machete across his chest.

Aftermath 

A large police deployment took place in Vienna right after the attack, and members of EKO Cobra and WEGA were brought in to hunt for the perpetrators. Vienna police said that special forces entered the gunman's apartment using explosives, and a search of its surroundings was underway on 3 November. The Austrian Federal Army was deployed to secure buildings in Vienna. Roadblocks were set up around the city center. Enhanced checks were instituted at the nearby Czech border.

After a few hours, people were evacuated from nearby restaurants, bars, the Vienna State Opera, and the Burgtheater. The Viennese police asked pedestrians to avoid open spaces and public transport in the area, and then halted all trams and subways in central Vienna and asked people to shelter in place.

All synagogues, Jewish schools, institutions of the Jewish Community of Vienna, and kosher restaurants and supermarkets were closed the following day as a precaution after concerns were raised that the main synagogue had been the target. Although soon after the attack it became clear that the target had been the general population, not the synagogue, which had been closed and empty at the time.

On 6 November, authorities decided that two mosques in Ottakring (German: Melit-Ibrahim-Moschee) and Meidling (German: Tewhid-Moschee) would be closed because "a positive attitude towards society and state" as a legal precondition was not fulfilled by the mosques. The mosques had reportedly contributed to the radicalization of the attacker and they were reportedly frequented by him and other Islamists. The Melit-Ibrahim-Moschee had previously reportedly been frequented by Islamist Mohamed M. and an Islamic State supporter who was subsequently jailed.

On 11 November, the Islamic cemetery in Wien-Liesing on the outskirts of Vienna refused to allow the attacker to be buried there, as did another Muslim cemetery in Austria.

See also

List of terrorist incidents in 2020
List of terrorist incidents linked to ISIL
List of Islamist terrorist attacks

References 

2020 murders in Austria
2020 mass shootings in Europe
2020 attack
2020 attack
Islamic terrorism in Austria
Islamic terrorist incidents in 2020
Mass shootings in Austria
November 2020 crimes in Europe
November 2020 events in Austria
Spree shootings in Europe
Terrorist incidents in Austria
Terrorist incidents in Europe in 2020
Murder in Vienna
Mass murder in 2020